Alsunga Parish is an administrative territorial entity of Kuldīga Municipality in the Courland region of Latvia. Prior to 2009, it was part of the now defunct Kuldīga District and from 2009 to 2021 of the former Alsunga Municipality.

Kuldīga Municipality
Parishes of Latvia
Vidzeme